Nawabad or Nayaabad or Naya Abad is a neighbourhood in Lyari, located in the Karachi South district of Karachi, Pakistan.

There are several ethnic groups in Nawabad including Muhajirs, Sindhis, Punjabis, Kashmiris, Seraikis, Pakhtuns, Balochis, Memons, Bohras and Ismailis. Over 99% of the population is Muslim. The population of Lyari Town is estimated to be over 600,000 in 2005.

References

External links 
 Karachi website

Neighbourhoods of Karachi
Lyari Town